Grace Ping (born July 2003) is a -tall American runner.  As a seventh grader in 2016, she "took down" a large field of female high school runners in a Minnesota cross-country invitational meet.  Grace "became a sort of folk hero" from this.

As a seventh grader, she was allowed to compete for Cotter High School, in Winona, Minnesota.  She set world records for 12-year-old girls in the 5,000 meters and two mile distances in 2016. As a 12 year old, she finished second behind 19-year-old Weini Kelati in the girls' 5,000 meters at the New Balance High School Nationals in Greensboro, North Carolina.

In 2016 her family moved to Utah, where, as an 8th-grader, she was not going to be allowed to compete in high school competitions. According to her father, Ryan Ping, she was expected nonetheless to compete in “significant indoor and outdoor meets this coming spring.”  Which she did: in March 2017, in San Francisco State Distance Carnival, she ran away from the field to achieve 16:26.83 in the outdoor 5000 meters, breaking the world record for 13 year old females by more than 10 seconds; the previous record had been set by Aleksandra Olinyk of Ukraine in 2007 in Mykolaiv, Ukraine. And in June 2017 she set another world record for 13-year-old girls in the 5,000, again breaking 16:30. This then beat a new record that had been set by Jordan Hasay, who later became a professional runner. In total she set "six age-group world records  between the 2-mile and 5K distances between the ages of 11 and 13."

By 2019, her family had moved to Arizona, and she and her younger sister Lauren, as a high school freshman, were regularly placing first and second in high school races in Arizona, at ages 16 and 14.  They were students at Desert Vista High School.  They led the high school team to an Arizona state championship in 2019.

However, having had an injury, she placed 30th in the Foot Locker Cross Country Championship race in San Diego in December 2019, and 27th in the Nike Cross National Championship Final.

In November 2020, Grace and her sister led the Desert Vista High School to a second Arizona state cross country championship and, by virtual race, to win the Nike-sponsored national championship as well.  The Desert Vista head coach was Megan Ping, their mother, and their father Ryan was an assistant coach.

According to MileSplitUSA in December 2020, she committed to attend Oklahoma State University after she graduates from high school in 2021.

References

External links
Grace Ping's running stats at MileSplitAZ
Youtube 2016 race taking down field of Roy Griak High School invitational
2017 race in San Francisco in which Ping broke world record for 5,000 meters for 13-year-olds by 10 seconds, amidst professional runners

American female long-distance runners
American female middle-distance runners
Sportspeople from Arizona
Sportspeople from Minnesota
Track and field athletes from Arizona
Track and field athletes from Minnesota
2003 births
Living people
21st-century American women